Kallukoottam is a panchayat town in Kanniyakumari district in the Indian state of Tamil Nadu.

Demographics
 India census, Kallukoottam had a population of 16,662. Males constitute 50% of the population and females 50%. Kallukoottam has an average literacy rate of 81%, higher than the national average of 59.5%: male literacy is 83%, and female literacy is 79%. In Kallukoottam, 10% of the population is under 6 years of age.

References

Cities and towns in Kanyakumari district